Brushy Fork Lake is an  impoundment on the South Branch South Fork Potomac River located three miles (5 km) south of Sugar Grove in southeastern Pendleton County, West Virginia, United States. Brushy Fork Lake lies in the Dry River District of the George Washington National Forest.

Chesapeake Bay watershed
Bodies of water of Pendleton County, West Virginia
Reservoirs in West Virginia
Potomac River watershed